Palliser Regional Division No. 26 or Palliser Regional Schools is a public school authority within the Canadian province of Alberta operating out of Lethbridge. The Palliser School Division services approximately 8,400 students across southern Alberta with 15 community schools, 17 Hutterian colony schools, 11 faith-based alternative schools, ten of which are in Calgary on nine different campuses, five outreach programs, an online school, and four Low German Mennonite alternative programs.

See also 
List of school authorities in Alberta

References

External links 

Education in Lethbridge
School districts in Alberta
Schools in the Palliser Regional District